Pamela Soltis (born November 13, 1957) is an American botanist. She is a distinguished professor at the University of Florida, curator at the Florida Museum of Natural History, principal investigator of the Laboratory of Molecular Systematics and Evolutionary Genetics at the Florida Museum of Natural History, and founding director of the University of Florida Biodiversity Institute.

Early life and education 
Soltis was born on November 13, 1957, in Nelsonville, Ohio, to Barbara D. Sagraves and Walter Ronald Sagraves. She attended Pella High School in Pella, Iowa, and graduated in 1976 as valedictorian. She was a National Merit Finalist in 1976. She earned her bachelor's degree in biology from Central College in 1980 and graduated summa cum laude. She then attended University of Kansas and earned an M.Phil. with honors in botany in 1984 and a Ph.D. in botany in 1986.

Career 
After earning her Ph.D., Soltis started as an assistant professor in the Department of Botany at Washington State University in 1986 and was promoted to associate professor in 1992. She was then promoted in full professor in the Department of Botany and School of Biological Sciences in 1998. In 2000 Soltis moved from Washington State University to University of Florida, Florida Museum of Natural History as curator. At the University of Florida, Soltis was University of Florida Research Foundation Research Professor from 2006 to 2009 and co-director of the UF Computational Biology Program from 2009 to 2012.

Research 
Soltis' research has focused on the patterns and processes that generated the tree of life. More specifically, she studies the flowering plant (angiosperm) diversity and evolution. She uses genomic methods, natural history collections and computational modeling to understand the phylogeny, phylogeography, and polyploidy of angiosperms. She has published over 400 scientific papers, and among her most cited contributions are papers on the role of genetic and genomic attributes in the success of polyploids. In 2016, Soltis was elected as a member of the National Academy of Sciences and the American Academy of Arts and Sciences in 2017.

Service 
Soltis was president of the Botanical Society of America 2007–08. She has served on the Councils of the Society for the Study of Evolution, the American Society of Plant Taxonomists, the American Genetics Association, and the Society of Systematic Biologists. She served a three-year term as secretary of the Botanical Society of America and is currently the president of the Society of Systematic Biologists. She also serves as an associate editor for the journals Evolution and Systematic Biology. She is a member of the University of Kansas Women's Hall of Fame.

Honors

She was the winner of the 2002 Dahlgren Prize in Botany from the Royal Physiographic Society of Sweden. Reuters named her as a highly cited researcher in 2014. She won, along with her husband, Douglas Soltis, the 2006 Asa Gray Award. She was elected to the National Academy of Sciences in 2016.

Selected publications

Scientific publications 

. 2004. The origin and diversification of angiosperms. Am. J. Bot. 91: 1614–1626
. 2004. Pre-angiosperm duplication of floral genes and regulatory tinkering at the base of angiosperms. Am. J. Bot. 91: 2102–2118
. 2004. Molecular cytogenetic analysis of recently evolved Tragopogon (Asteraceae) allopolyploids reveal a karyotype that is additive of the diploid progenitors. Am. J. Bot. 91: 1022–1035
. 2004. Darwin's abominable mystery: Insights from a supertree of the angiosperms. Proceedings of the National Academy of Sciences, USA 101: 1904–1909.
. 2003. Evolution of floral structures in basal angiosperms. International Journal of Plant Sciences 164: S329-S363.
. 2003. An update of the Angiosperm Phylogeny Group classification for the orders and families of flowering plants: APG II. Bot. J. of the Linnean Soc. 141: 399-436
. 2002. Rate heterogeneity among lineages of land plants: integration of molecular and fossil data and evidence for molecular living fossils. Proc. of the National Academy of Sci. USA 99: 4430-4435
. 2000. Patterns of genetic variation in rare and widespread plant congeners: Do rare species have low levels of genetic variability? Am. J. Bot. 87: 783-792
. 1999. Angiosperm phylogeny inferred from multiple genes: A research tool for comparative biology. Nature 402: 402-404

Books
 . 2006. Developmental genetics of the flower. Volumen 44 de Advances in botanical research incorporating advances in plant pathology. Edición ilustrada de Academic Press, 616 pp.  en línea
 . 1992. Molecular systematics of plants. Editor Springer, 434 pp.  en línea
 . 1990. Isozymes in plant biology. Edición ilustrada de Springer, 268 pp.  en línea
 . 1986. Studies of genetic variation in an introgressive complex in Clarkia (Onagraceae). Editor University of Kansas, Botany, 596 pp.

References

American taxonomists
1957 births
Living people
American women botanists
Women taxonomists
Members of the United States National Academy of Sciences
Botanical Society of America
University of Florida faculty
University of Kansas alumni
20th-century American botanists
21st-century American botanists
20th-century American women scientists
21st-century American women scientists
Women evolutionary biologists
American women academics
American women curators
American curators